The Long Road North is the eighth studio album by Swedish post-metal band Cult of Luna (their ninth if including Mariner (2016), their collaborative album with Julie Christmas). The album was released on 11 February 2022 through Metal Blade Records. It peaked at No. 14 on the German albums chart.

Promotion
To promote the album, on 1 December 2021, Cult of Luna released the song "Cold Burn" prior to the release of The Long Road North, with a music video created using Unreal Engine, in collaboration with North Kingdom and Arctic Game Lab. The band also released the song "Into the Night" on 13 January 2022. In support of The Long Road North, Cult of Luna have embarked on a 2022 tour through Europe in February and March, and will continue the tour in October. One of the concerts in the tour included their 'Beyond The Redshift' festival on 12 March 2022, co-headlined with bands such as Alcest, Brutus, and Svalbard.

Reception
The album was generally well received critically, earning two positive reviews in Louder Sound. At Metal Injection, Ben G. labeled The Long Road North "a superb album that is more mature, nuanced and consistent than their 2019 masterpiece, A Dawn to Fear, but also maybe a bit less transcendental." Ellis Heasley of Distorted Sound explained in a review, "Even by their supremely lofty standards, The Long Road North is yet another triumph for the band. Nearly 70 minutes feels like no time at all, with the album working best when given your undivided attention. Once it’s over, you'll no doubt be quick to take this 'long road' all over again."

Accolades

Track listing
All tracks written by Cult of Luna, except where noted:

Personnel
Band members
 Thomas Hedlund – drums and percussion
 Andreas Johansson – bass guitar
 Fredrik Kihlberg – guitar and vocals
 Magnus Lindberg – guitar, drums and engineering
 Johannes Persson – guitar and vocals
 Kristian Karlsson – keyboards, vocals and engineering

Additional personnel
 Mariam Wallentin – vocals on 'Beyond (I)'
 Christian Mazzalai (Phoenix) – guitar on 'Blood Upon Stone'
 Laurent Brancowitz (Phoenix) – guitar on 'Blood Upon Stone'
 Colin Stetson – bass saxophones, tubax, flutes and lyricon on 'Beyond (II)' and 'An Offering to the Wild' 
 Erik Olofsson – artwork and graphic design
 Henrik Oja – additional engineering
 Daniel Berglund – additional engineering
 Ted Jensen – mastering

Charts

References

Cult of Luna albums
2022 albums
Metal Blade Records albums